South Road, or the Main South Road, is a major north–south arterial road in South Australia.

South Road may also refer to:
South Road Bridge, Northern Central Railway, a historic stone arch bridge in Pennsylvania, United States
South Road Extension, or the Dingley Arterial Road Project, a partially-completed arterial road in Melbourne, Australia
South Road Properties, a 300 hectare island-type reclamation area in Cebu City, Philippines
South Road Superway, an elevated motorway in Adelaide, Australia
South Road Trail, or the Applegate Trail, an emigrant trail through California and Nevada, United States